The 2016 season is Grêmio Foot-Ball Porto Alegrense's 113th season in existence and the club's 11th consecutive season in the top division of Brazilian football. At this season, Grêmio participate in the Campeonato Brasileiro Série A, the Copa Libertadores de América, the Copa do Brasil and the Campeonato Gaúcho.

Club

Staff

Board members
 President: Romildo Bolzan Jr.
 Vice-president: Adalberto Preis
 Vice-president: Antônio Dutra Júnior
 Vice-president: Cláudio Oderich
 Vice-president: Marcos Herrmann
 Vice-president: Odorico Roman
 Vice-president: Sergei Costa
 Vice-president of football: Alberto Guerra
 Football adviser: Alexandre Rolim
 Director of football: Antônio Dutra Júnior
 Executive of football: Júnior Chávare
 Superintendent: Antônio Carlos Verardi
 Supervisor of football: Marcelo Rudolph

Coaching staff
 Head coach: Roger Machado
 Assistant coach: Roberto Ribas
 Assistant coach: James Freitas
 Fitness coach: Rogério Dias
 Assistant fitness coach: Mário Pereira
 Assistant fitness coach: Gabriel Alves
 Goalkeeper coach: Rogério Godoy
 Performance analyst: Eduardo Cecconi
 Performance analyst: Antônio Cruz
 Performance analyst: Rafael Tavares

Medical staff
 Doctor: Márcio Bolzoni
 Doctor: Felipe do Canto
 Doctor: Paulo Rabaldo
 Doctor: Márcio Dornelles
 Physiologist: José Leandro
 Physiologist: Rafael Gobbato
 Physiotherapist: Henrique Valente
 Physiotherapist: Ingrael do Amaral
 Massagist: Marco Zeilmann
 Massagist: José Flores
 Massagist: Anderson Meurer
 Nurse: Adriano Welter
 Nutritionist: Katiuce Borges
Last updated: 25 May 2016.
Source: Portal Oficial do Grêmio

Other staff
 Press officer: João Paulo Fontoura
 Cameraman: Juares Dagort
 Equipment manager: Marco Severino
 Equipment manager: Danilo Bueno
 Assistant equipment manager: Antônio Marcos
 Butler: Paulo Oliveira
 Chief security: Luiz Fernando Cardoso
 Security: Cristiano Nunes
 Security: Pedro Carvalho
 Security: André Trisch
 Security: Sandro Alegre
 Security: José Nolan
 Caretaker: Moacir da Luz
 Motorist: Valdeci Coelho
 Maintenance technician: Higino Luciano
 Knave: João Brito

Kit
Supplier: Umbro
Sponsor(s): Banrisul / Unimed

Squad information

First team squad
Players and informations last updated on 2 June 2016.Note: Flags indicate national team as has been defined under FIFA eligibility rules. Players may hold more than one non-FIFA nationality.

Starting XI
4–2–3–1 Formation

According to the most recent line-ups, not most used players (in Notes).

Friendlies

Pre-season

Competitions

Overview

Campeonato Gaúcho

Matches

Quarter-finals

Semi-finals

Primeira Liga

Group stage

Group B

Matches

Copa Libertadores

Group stage

Group 6

Matches

Final stage

Matches

Round of 16

Campeonato Brasileiro

League table

Matches

Copa do Brasil

Matches

Round of 16

Quarter-finals

Semi-finals

Final

Statistics

Appearances and goals

|-
! colspan="18" style="background:#E6E8FA; text-align:center"|Goalkeepers

|-
! colspan="16" style="background:#E6E8FA; text-align:center"|Defenders

|-
! colspan="16" style="background:#E6E8FA; text-align:center"|Midfielders

|-
! colspan="16" style="background:#E6E8FA; text-align:center"|Forwards

|-
! colspan="16" style="background:#E6E8FA; text-align:center"|Players who currently don't integrate the squad

Goalscorers
The list include all goals in competitive matches.

As of 5 June 2016.
Source: Match reports in Competitions.

Clean sheets

As of 5 June 2016.
Source: Match reports in Competitions.

Overview
{|class="wikitable" style="font-size:90%"
|-
|Games played        || 32 (5 Campeonato Brasileiro, 8 Copa Libertadores de América, 3 Primeira Liga, 16 Campeonato Gaúcho)
|-
|Games won           || 18 (3 Campeonato Brasileiro, 3 Copa Libertadores de América, 1 Primeira Liga, 11 Campeonato Gaúcho)
|-
|Games drawn         || 7 (1 Campeonato Brasileiro, 2 Copa Libertadores de América, 2 Primeira Liga, 2 Campeonato Gaúcho)
|-
|Games lost          || 7 (1 Campeonato Brasileiro, 3 Copa Libertadores de América, 3 Campeonato Gaúcho)
|-
|Goals scored        || 58
|-
|Goals conceded      || 34
|-
|Goal difference     || +24
|-
|Clean sheets        || 12
|-
|Best result         || 5–1 (A) v Passo Fundo – Campeonato Gaúcho – 30 March
|-
|Worst result        || 3–0 (A) v Rosario Central – Copa Libertadores de América – 5 May
|-
|Top scorer          || Luan (8)
|-

Home attendances

References

2016 Season
Brazilian football clubs 2016 season